Little Mount Cameroon, also known as Etinde, is a  peak on the southern flank of Mount Cameroon.

References

Mount Cameroon
Mountains of Cameroon
Volcanoes of Cameroon
Southwest Region (Cameroon)